Cody White may refer to:
 Cody White (offensive guard) (born 1988), American football offensive guard for the Houston Texans
 Cody White (wide receiver) (born 1998), American football wide receiver for the Pittsburgh Steelers